Muricauda taeanensis is a Gram-negative, strictly aerobic, heterotrophic and moderate halophilic bacterium from the genus of Muricauda which has been isolated from tidal flat sediments of Taean in Korea.

References

External links
Type strain of Muricauda taeanensis at BacDive -  the Bacterial Diversity Metadatabase

Further reading 
 

Flavobacteria
Bacteria described in 2013